Interstate 93 (I-93) is an Interstate Highway in the New England states of Massachusetts, New Hampshire, and Vermont in the United States. Spanning approximately  along a north–south axis, it is one of three primary Interstate Highways located entirely within New England; the other two are I-89 and I-91. The largest cities along the route are Boston, Massachusetts, and Manchester, New Hampshire; it also travels through the New Hampshire state capital of Concord.

I-93 begins at an interchange with I-95, US Route 1 (US 1) and Route 128 in Canton, Massachusetts. It travels concurrently with US 1 beginning in Canton, and, with Route 3 beginning at the Braintree Split on the Braintree–Quincy city line, through the Central Artery in Downtown Boston before each route splits off beyond the Leonard P. Zakim Bunker Hill Memorial Bridge. The portion of highway between the Braintree Split and the Central Artery is named the "Southeast Expressway", while the portion from Boston to the New Hampshire state line is named the "Northern Expressway".

I-93 ends in Waterford, Vermont, at I-91. For most of its length, I-93 indirectly parallels US 3. In New Hampshire, the two highways have several interchanges with each other, as well as a concurrency through Franconia Notch State Park.

Route description

|-
|
|
|-
|
|
|-
|
|
|-
|Total
|
|}

Massachusetts

I-93's southern terminus is at exit 26 (formerly exit 12) of I-95 in Canton, cosigned with US 1 north. At this junction, I-95 north heads to the northwest (cosigned with US 1 south, as well as Route 128, which begins at the interchange), to serve as the beltway around Boston, while I-95 south runs by itself southwest through Boston's southwestern suburbs toward Rhode Island. The southernmost  of I-93 run east through Boston's southern suburbs, passing through Canton and Randolph. In Randolph, I-93 meets the northern end of Route 24 (Fall River Expressway/AMVETS Memorial Highway) at exit 4. I-93 continues east into Braintree, interchanging with Route 3, the major freeway linking Boston to Cape Cod, at exit 7 (known locally as the "Braintree Split"). Route 3 north joins I-93 and US 1, and the highway turns north toward Boston. These first  of I-93 follow what was formerly part of Route 128 before it was truncated at the I-95/I-93 junction, and many locals still refer to this section of roadway as part of Route 128.

Upon turning northward, the highway is known as the Southeast Expressway, passing through Quincy and Milton before crossing into the city of Boston over the Neponset River. After the Massachusetts Avenue connector exit, the highway officially becomes the John F. Fitzgerald Expressway, also known as the Central Artery, and passes beneath Downtown Boston. A major intersection with the Massachusetts Turnpike/I-90 (exit 16, formerly 20) takes place just south of Downtown Boston. After the massive interchange, motorists use the O'Neill Tunnel to travel underneath the city and then use the Leonard P. Zakim Bunker Hill Memorial Bridge to cross the Charles River. Route 3 leaves the Artery just before the Zakim bridge via exit 18 (formerly 26), and US 1 leaves the Artery just after the bridge, via exit 19 (formerly 27) (no southbound access). From Boston through the rest of Massachusetts, Concord, New Hampshire, appears as the control city on northbound overhead signs. The Artery ends as I-93 continues north out of the city.

I-93 continues through the northern suburbs of Boston, coming to a second interchange with I-95 and Route 128, which run concurrently. Travelers going north can either change over to I-95 north to eventually reach Maine or remain on I-93 toward New Hampshire. Farther north, in Andover, I-93 meets I-495, providing access to Worcester to the southwest and New Hampshire's Seacoast Region to the northeast. Just south of the state line, I-93 crosses the Merrimack River into Methuen, where it intersects Route 110 and Route 113 at exit 43 (formerly 46) just north of the river crossing. Between 2014 and 2018, the Route 110/Route 113 junction beneath I-93 was converted from a rotary to a partial cloverleaf, with the new traffic patterns opening in various stages during 2016 and 2017. On I-93 northbound, the exit was split into 43A (formerly 46A) for Route 110 and Route 113 eastbound, and 43B (formerly 46B) for Route 110 and Route 113 westbound. I-93 then interchanges with the western end of Route 213, a connector between I-93 and I-495.

In all, I-93 has 46 (formerly 48) numbered exits in Massachusetts, although, before the mileage-based exit numbering system was implemented in 2021, several numbers were skipped in and near Boston. Several exits were removed from I-93 to address traffic problems in addition to converting the Central Artery from 6 to 8 to 10 lanes, by reducing the combined number of on- and offramps from 27 to 14. Exit 46 (formerly 48) in Methuen, just before the New Hampshire state line, is the highest-numbered exit along the entire route. I-93 once had only 22 exits prior to the rerouting of I-95 onto Route 128. Nearly the entire length of I-93 in Massachusetts carries four lanes in each direction. Average daily traffic volumes on I-93 in the state range from 100,000 vehicles at the New Hampshire border and 150,000 vehicles at the southern end at I-95 to over 200,000 vehicles through Braintree and Quincy.

New Hampshire
Serving as the main Interstate route in New Hampshire, it connects the state capital, Concord, and its largest city, Manchester. Beyond Concord are the towns of Tilton, Plymouth, and Littleton. I-93 is designated as the Alan B. Shepard Highway, from the Massachusetts line to Hooksett (just north of Manchester at the northern terminus of I-293), as the Everett Turnpike from Hooksett to Concord, and as the Styles Bridges Highway, after the US politician, from Concord to the Vermont line. This section of roadway was constructed between 1961 and 1977.

Between the northern end of I-293 in Hooksett and the beginning of I-89 in Bow, I-93 also carries the northern end of the Everett Turnpike. There is one toll booth along this section, at exit 11 in Hooksett; the toll for passenger cars is $1.00 ($0.50 at the ramp toll booth). This is the only toll collected along the entire length of the highway. I-93 in New Hampshire is also notable for having state liquor stores serve as rest areas, which are passed just after the toll plaza, traveling north. There are separate stores on both sides of the Interstate for travelers in each direction.

I-93 enters New Hampshire at Salem. A rest area and welcome center is available on the northbound side of the freeway, directly before exit 1. I-93 is four lanes wide in each direction for its first , until the split with I-293 and New Hampshire Route 101 (NH 101), where I-93 drops to three lanes before adding a fourth and fifth lane back to the freeway after the interchange. The construction to widen I-93 to four lanes each way between the Massachusetts–New Hampshire border and its junction with I-293 and NH 101 was fully complete as of April 2021.

I-93 and NH 101 run concurrently for about  before NH 101 exits to the east as its own freeway, serving Portsmouth and the Seacoast Region. I-93 maintains three lanes of traffic in each direction until the junction with I-89, then is a four-lane freeway through most of its journey northward, with the only exception being the Franconia Notch section.

In the state capital of Concord, I-393 heads directly east (cosigned with eastbound US 4 and US 202), providing another route to the Seacoast Region. Westbound US 4 joins I-93 and runs concurrently with it, crossing the Merrimack River again, until exit 17 for Penacook, about  farther north, before exiting westward. Continuing north, I-93 traverses the Lakes Region of New Hampshire and then makes its way north through the heart of the White Mountains Region. I-93 passes through Franconia Notch State Park as a super-two parkway (one lane in each direction) with a  speed limit, designed to reduce I-93's impact on Franconia Notch. For the trip through Franconia Notch, I-93 and US 3 run concurrently.

Beyond Franconia Notch State Park, US 3 heads northeastward through the Great North Woods Region, while I-93 runs to the northwest. The final town along I-93 in New Hampshire is Littleton, served by four exits. Many motorist services are available at exit 42. After passing through town, it crosses the Connecticut River into Vermont. The last exit along I-93 is exit 44 for Monroe, through which a rest area and welcome center is accessible to travelers on both sides of the highway.

The new limit took effect on January 1, 2014.

Vermont
A rest area and welcome center is located along the northbound side of the highway for travelers entering from New Hampshire. The final  of the Interstate actually veer to the southwest while traveling northbound. Vehicles bound for Canada can use northbound I-91 to reach the Derby Line–Stanstead Border Crossing at that Interstate's end, and northwards into Canada as an autoroute freeway into the Canadian province of Quebec. The portion of I-93 in Vermont parallels both US 2 and Vermont Route 18 (VT 18).

History

Southeast Expressway
The Southeast Expressway was constructed between 1954 and 1959, at the same time the John F. Fitzgerald Expressway (Central Artery) was built. Its northern terminus is at exit 15 (southbound) or 15B (northbound) (former exit 18; Frontage Road) in South Boston, a former Y interchange where the canceled Southwest Corridor/I-95 was to meet with I-93 and run concurrent northward into downtown. The southern terminus is at the Y interchange (the "Braintree Split") at exit 7 in Braintree (the former southern terminus of Route 128). A section of the expressway, beginning south of the Savin Hill overpass and ending just before the Braintree Split, utilizes a zipper lane, in which a movable barrier carves out a reversible high-occupancy vehicle lane (HOV lane) on the non-peak side of the highway during rush hour. Most of the right of way for the Granite Railway in Milton and Quincy was incorporated into the expressway.

Boston

The Central Artery, officially the John F. Fitzgerald Expressway, was a section of highway in Downtown Boston constructed in the 1950s and was originally designed as a fully elevated highway. This new highway was greatly disliked by the citizens of the city because it cut the heart of the city in half; cast long, dreary shadows; and was an eyesore to the community. Because of the public outcry, Governor John A. Volpe ordered the southern half of the highway redesigned so that it was underground; this section became known as the Dewey Square Tunnel. With the cancelation of the highway projects leading into the city in 1972 by Governor Francis Sargent, the Central Artery gained the designation of I-93 in 1974. It has also carried the local highway designations of US 1 (since 1989) and Route 3.

By the mid-1970s, I-93 had outgrown its capacity and had begun to deteriorate due to a lack of maintenance. State Transportation Secretary Frederick P. Salvucci, aware of the issues surrounding the elevated roadway, proposed a plan conceived in the early 1970s by the Boston Transportation Planning Review to replace the rusting elevated six-lane Central Artery with a new, more efficient underground roadway. This plan was merged with a long-standing proposal to build a third harbor tunnel to alleviate congestion in the Sumner and Callahan tunnels to East Boston; the new plan became known as the Central Artery/Tunnel Project or the Big Dig.

These new roadways were built during a 12-year period from 1994 to early 2006. The massive project became the largest urban construction project ever undertaken in US history. Construction on the new I-93 segment was not without serious issues: a lengthy federal environmental review pushed the start of construction back from approximately 1990, causing many inflationary increases, while funding for the project was the subject of several political battles between President Ronald Reagan and Representative Tip O'Neill. Major construction on the new roadway was done while maintaining the old roadway, a step that also greatly increased the cost of the project. The original Charles River crossing, named Scheme Z, was the object of great public outcry similar to that of the building of the original highway. The outcry eventually led to the replacement of Scheme Z with a newer, more sleek cable-stayed bridge and complementing exit for Cambridge, increasing the cost even more.

In Downtown Boston, I-93 is made up of the O'Neill Tunnel and Leonard P. Zakim Bunker Hill Memorial Bridge, which spans the Charles River. The underground construction of the tunnel system was completed as of October 2006; however, repairs continue to many parts of the tunnel due to water leakage because of improper construction of the slurry walls supporting the O'Neill Tunnel. The former route of the above-ground Artery, so named "the other Green Monster" by Mayor Thomas Menino, was replaced mostly by open space known formally as the Rose Fitzgerald Kennedy Greenway.

Additional improvements were done in the South Bay section of the highway: the I-90/I-93 interchange was completely redesigned, a new HOV lane extending from the zipper lane in Quincy was added and the South Boston Haul road that was constructed to bypass truck traffic around residential streets in the South End was opened to general traffic.

Hazardous cargos are prohibited from I-93 in Boston over safety issues in the tunnels; these cargos must exit at either the Leverett Circle connector when traveling southbound or at the Massachusetts Avenue exit when traveling northbound.

Northern Expressway
The Northern Expressway was constructed from Medford to the New Hampshire border between 1956 and 1963. It was extended through Somerville and Charlestown to the Central Artery, US 1, and the planned route of the Inner Belt Expressway (I-695) between 1965 and 1973. Because it was already under construction, the highway was granted an exception to the moratorium on highway expansion inside Route 128 which was announced in 1970.

I-93's original southern terminus was in Cambridge (just north of Boston), where it was to meet the Inner Belt. However, when that route was canceled, and the I-95 section into Boston was canceled and rerouted along Route 128 in the mid-1970s, I-93's route was extended an additional  down the Central Artery (which had been signed as a concurrency of I-95/Route 3 before I-95 was rerouted) and the Southeast Expressway (what was then just Route 3) from Boston to Braintree and then west along former Route 128 to its intersection with I-95 in Canton.

In an attempt to alleviate rush-hour traffic jams, travel in the breakdown lane of I-93 is permitted on a small stretch between exit 35 (formerly 41) and exit 46 (formerly 43). This extra travel is permitted on the southbound side on weekdays between 6:00 am and 10:00 am and on the northbound side between 3:00 pm and 7:00 pm. However, on most busy days, this fails to prevent traffic delays. The Massachusetts State Police is displeased with this arrangement, citing that traffic in the breakdown lanes interferes with the ability of emergency vehicles to respond to accidents.

Rapid bridge replacement project
In August 2010, in Medford, a  section of bridge deck on the northbound side partially collapsed due to age-related structural fatigue. The collapse forced the Massachusetts Department of Transportation (MassDOT) to evaluate the remaining bridges along the corridor, eventually deciding to replace several bridges along the highway in a plan called 93 Fast 14. MassDOT set in motion a plan to replace the superstructure and concrete decks on 14 overpass bridges along that section of the Interstate, using rapid bridge replacement methods. The $98.1-million (equivalent to $ in ) project replaced bridges originally built in 1957 with a set of prefabricated modular concrete bridges in a series of weekend roadway closures. Traffic was diverted into a series of crossover lanes during construction. The main part of the project took place each weekend from June through August 2011, with the exception of the July 4 holiday weekend. One or two bridges were replaced each weekend during the construction time frame. The project was part of the commonwealth's Accelerated Bridge Program.

Methuen Rotary
Off exit 43 (formerly 46) in Methuen, the surface level traffic circle was rebuilt as part of an overall infrastructure improvement that also included constructing a new bridge carrying the Interstate over the local road, reconstructing on- and offramps to the highway, and realigning the Interstate itself.

New Hampshire
As originally envisioned by the federal government, I-93 would have followed the route of present US 3/Northwest Expressway/Everett Turnpike from Boston to Concord. By 1956, the two states had drawn up new plans for I-93 to the east, bypassing the tolled Everett Turnpike from Manchester southward along a new alignment, known as the "Northern Expressway" in Massachusetts and crossing into New Hampshire in Salem. The New Hampshire section south of Hooksett would be named the Alan B. Shepard Highway, named for the first American in space, a Derry native.

The first part of I-93 completed in New Hampshire opened in Salem from the Massachusetts border to exit 2 (NH 38/NH 97) in August 1961. The route was extended gradually northward over the next several years, reaching exit 3 (NH 111) by the end of 1961, as well as a second segment from the I-293/NH 101 west interchange to exit 7 (NH 101 east) at the same time. The two segments were connected in late 1962. This left a gap in I-93, as traffic was directed along NH 101 West and the Everett Turnpike, while the southern segment of I-93 continued on and ended in a stub at exit 7.

By 1963, the route had been completed from the end of the Everett Turnpike section, through Concord and north to Tilton (exit 20), and to NH 104 in New Hampton by 1964 (exit 23) and to Plymouth by 1965 (exit 26), and from there gradually northward until it reached the southern end of Franconia Notch. By 1977, I-93 was completed between exit 7 and the Everett Turnpike in Hooksett, completing the Alan B. Shepard Highway segment of I-93 and closing the gap that had stood for 15 years. The Everett Turnpike section had been built in 1957 and incorporated into I-93 in 1958. After the completion of the Alan B. Shepard Highway portion, the portion concurrent with NH 101 was widened to eight lanes, while the Everett Turnpike section from Hooksett to Concord was widened to six lanes in 1978.

A small segment was also completed from the northern end of Franconia Notch to Littleton prior to 1984, with the final stretch from Littleton to the Vermont border completed by 1984. This left a gap through Franconia Notch, with traffic directed along US 3 between the two sections. For years, debates over how to minimize environmental impact on the road through the notch prevented it being built. As a compromise the Franconia Notch Parkway, a super-two roadway with  speed limit, was completed in June 1988, replacing US 3. Originally, this road was not included in I-93, as it had its own exit numbers and was signed "TO I-93", though, later, the parkway was officially added to the Interstate System despite the substandard conditions and the exits renumbered. The parkway opened in June 1988, replacing Route 3, and grade crossings were replaced by an overpass.

Begun in 2006 and continuing until 2021, the portion between the state border and the I-293 southern terminus was widened to eight lanes; this necessitated the rebuilding and/or relocation of several interchanges. An additional exit has been proposed near milemarker 13 that would include a new connector road to NH 28, effectively bypassing downtown Derry and relieving traffic along NH 102 at exit 4.

Vermont
Construction of I-93 in Vermont was completed in 1982. It was planned to be built longer if I-91 did not change its designation eastward in the northeastern part of the state. It was the last Interstate to be built in the state.

Future expansion

Massachusetts plans
Since 1996, the Massachusetts Highway Department (MassHighway) has studied rebuilding the interchange of I-93 and I-95 in Woburn along the border with Stoneham and Reading. The project was expected to start in early 2017 and cost $267 million but continued community opposition has postponed the project indefinitely. A project to upgrade the I-93/I-95 interchange in Canton is proposed.

An additional 2010 proposal to upgrade Route 24, running southwards from I-93's exit 4 to I-195 near Fall River, has also been put off due to studies showing the cost of the project being very high.

MassDOT and its predecessor MassHighway have planned on widening I-93 to a uniform four travel lanes in both directions from the lane drop near exit 35 (formerly 41) in Wilmington to the New Hampshire border since the beginning of the 2000s. The first section of widening will be done as part of the I-93 Tri-Town Interchange Project. The project will construct a new interchange in Wilmington. Early estimates of the entire project place the cost at $567 million.

New Hampshire plans
Initial plans to widen I-93 to a uniform four travel lanes in both directions from Salem to Manchester beginning in 2008 were put on hold due to a lawsuit designed to force the New Hampshire Department of Transportation (NHDOT) to update the plans to include other transportation options. Under orders from the US District Court, NHDOT and the US Department of Transportation (USDOT) must provide an updated environmental review. The Conservation Law Foundation (CLF) filed a lawsuit in February 2006, hoping to force any expansion plans in the area to include the restoration of commuter rail service between Manchester and Boston. Despite the suit, the exit 1 interchange construction was allowed to undergo upgrading and expansion; other associated projects related to the widening, chiefly around exits 3 and 5, were also eventually allowed to proceed. The whole set of projects were eventually allowed to move forward following an agreement between the state and the CLF that removed the group's opposition to construction which does not pose a threat to the environment.

As part of the 2009 stimulus package, New Hampshire was set to receive several million dollars in highway construction funds. One of the projects was the widening of a portion of the highway between the Massachusetts border and Manchester. Bidding was set to begin in February 2009, with construction slated to begin in late 2009 or early 2010. The plans called for NHDOT to widen the southernmost  of I-93 to four lanes in each direction, from the two. In addition, all five interchanges along this length would be upgraded to accommodate larger amounts of traffic, including replacing many aging bridges. According to plans filed by the state with USDOT, the project was scheduled to run from 2009 through 2016, with work starting at the Massachusetts line and moving northward to Manchester. The project was designed with an intermodal transit bent; new or improved park and ride facilities were deployed at exits 1, 3, and 5, and a widened median strip was designed to accommodate a planned commuter rail service between Boston and Manchester.

As a way to help defray the costs of the expansion, in early 2010 the NHDOT made a formal request to the Federal Highway Administration to add tolls to I-93 at the Massachusetts–New Hampshire border. The proposal faced opposition from state legislators in both states who claimed the tolls would cause severe congestion in the area and lead to an economic burden to local residents. Opponents included US Senator Scott Brown. The proposal was eventually dropped in favor of issuing new state bonds to pay for expansion. The new policy was laid out by Transportation Commissioner George Campbell after reviewing the proposal and receiving a promise from the MassDOT that it would not be enacting a similar toll on the Massachusetts side of the border.

Plans were announced in 2012 that I-93 would have a new northbound and southbound bridge over I-89 in Bow. To reduce traffic on the southbound bridge, NHDOT added a third lane to ease congestion. The bridges were completed in 2014.

More plans were announced in 2014 that the Hooksett rest areas would be rebuilt. The new rest areas feature a 14-pump Irving Oil gas station, a new New Hampshire liquor and wine outlet, and a few restaurants and shops. The project was completed in 2015.

In Londonderry, a new exit 4A and connector road to the town of Derry were in final planning stages as of June 2020.

Exit list
Massachusetts converted from sequential to distance-based exit numbering on I-93 in mid-2021. New Hampshire continues to use sequential exit numbering on all of its freeways. Vermont added "milepoint exit" numbers to existing signs in 2020, essentially marking each interchange with two exit numbers (except the I-91 interchange, which was previously unnumbered).

.

Auxiliary routes
 Manchester, New Hampshire—I-293: The southernmost portion of this highway, between I-93 and the Everett Turnpike, was once known as Interstate 193.
 Concord, New Hampshire—I-393

See also

References

External links

 

Interstate 93
93
93
93
93
Streets in Braintree, Massachusetts
Transportation in Belknap County, New Hampshire
Transportation in Caledonia County, Vermont
Transportation in Essex County, Massachusetts
Transportation in Grafton County, New Hampshire
Transportation in Hillsborough County, New Hampshire
Transportation in Merrimack County, New Hampshire
Transportation in Middlesex County, Massachusetts
Transportation in Norfolk County, Massachusetts
Transportation in Rockingham County, New Hampshire
Transportation in Suffolk County, Massachusetts
Interstate 93
Roads with a reversible lane